Marko Ganchev Marinov is a Bulgarian writer, satirist, essayist, author of children's literature and public figure.

Biography 
Marko Ganchev was born in 1932 in the village of Marcha, which today is a neighborhood in the town of Dryanovo.

His first poem was published in 1942 in the capital's children's newspaper "Drugarche" by KP Domuschiev. In 1946 he began to collaborate regularly with poems in the high school newspapers "Srednoshkolsko Edinstvo" and "EMOS", both published in Sofia. In 1950 he graduated from high school in Dryanovo and was accepted as a student of Bulgarian philology at Sofia University. As a student in 1950-1955 he published poetry in the newspapers "Narodna Mladezh", "Literary Front", "Starling" and in literary magazines and anthologies. After graduating in Bulgarian philology he was sent by the Union of Bulgarian Writers to Tirana, Albania, to prepare for a translation of poetry from Albanian.

Marko Ganchev's first collection of poems, "The Seeds Ripen", was published in 1957.

From 1961 to 1968 he headed the cultural department and was a member of the editorial board of the Starling newspaper. From 1968 he was the head of the Poetry editorial board at the Narodna Kultura publishing house, until 1971, when he was expelled from the Bulgarian Communist Party for refusing to vote on a resolution against Alexander Solzhenitsyn. He continued to work in the department as a regular editor, and from 1979 to 1984 he was an editor in the magazine "Contemporary".

From 1984 to 1989 he was the editor-in-chief of the almanac for humor and satire "Apropo", published by the House of Humor and Satire in Gabrovo. In 1989, he began running a column twice a week on Radio Free Europe, in which he read political essays under the general title "Farewell to the Totalitarian System." From December 1989 to 1993 he was the editor-in-chief of the Literary Front newspaper, which in the meantime was renamed the Literary Forum.

Ganchev was a member of the Union of Democratic Forces in the 7th Grand National Assembly, he signed the new constitution and was then expelled from the UDF. From 1993 to 1999 he was the Ambassador of the Republic of Bulgaria to the Republic of Belarus, after which he became a freelance writer.

Awards 
2001: National Literary Award "P. R. Slaveykov”, awarded to him by the Ministry of Education and Science for his overall work for children and adolescents.
2002: Order "Stara Planina" 1st degree for outstanding contribution to Bulgarian culture.
2003: National Literary Award for Humor and Satire "Rayko Alexiev" , awarded by the Municipality of Pazardzhik for overall literary creativity and contribution to the field of humor and satire.
2008: National Award "Konstantin Konstantinov" for overall contribution to children's book publishing.
2021: April Prize for Comprehensive Creativity.

Bibliography

Lyrics 
The seeds ripen, 1957
All Roads and One, 1965
The Right to Be Awake, 1966
Running Tree, 1969
Sunday Happiness, 1971
Silent Sirens, 1977
Great family, 1987

Satire 
Martian Enthusiasm, 1960
Second Coming, 1964
Your own man, bibl. Hornet No. 100, 1965
Fixing the World, 1967
Rearview Mirror, 1975 and 1978
Scratches, 1979 and 1984
Epigrams, 1979
Profession Disagreement, 1982
Veterans of Nothing, 1985
Nothing Funny, 1988
Short circuits, 1989
Barking on the Caravan, 2006
King and Cattleman, 2010
In Search of the Lost Tribe, 2012;

For children 
The Terrible Gloom, poems, 1971
What to Do, Poems and Tales, 1973
Farewell to the Goblins, Tales, 1974
The Crocodile's Younger Brother, Tales, 1976
Pouch with popcorn, poems, 1977
Book with binoculars, poems, 1978
Spherical Lightning, Tales, 1980
Big and small, poems, 1980
Punch songs, poems, 1983
Do You Have a Tickle, Tales, 1984;
The Lost Tower, poems, 1984
Bag for Tomorrow, poems, 1987
The Ghost Heide Holan, poems, 1990
Donkey works, poems, 2004
The white dove, poems

Essays 
Forgiveness and the Curse of Deception, 1990
The Triumphal Arches to Literature, 1998
Laluger of the two systems, 1998

Selected 
Lyrics, 1979
Selected Satires, 1982
Funny Sadness, 2002

References 

1932 births
Living people
Bulgarian writers
Union of Democratic Forces (Bulgaria) politicians
People from Dryanovo